On 21 April 2022, a powerful bomb rocked the Shia Seh Dokan mosque in Mazar-i-Sharif, Balkh Province, Afghanistan killing at least 31 people and injuring more than 87 others. The Islamic State – Khorasan Province claimed responsibility via Telegram.

Worshippers were performing the Zuhr prayer inside the mosque when the bomb exploded. Authorities counted 31 dead and at least 87 injured, six of whom were wounded critically.

The bombing was part of a series of attacks on the same day, including two explosions targeting Taliban officers in Kunduz and Khogyani District and a bombing that injured two Shia children in Kabul.

Background

The Islamic State said the attack on the Mazar-e-Sharif mosque was carried out using a remote-controlled booby trapped bag when the building was packed with worshipers. The group called the attack part of an ongoing global campaign to "avenge" the deaths of its former leader and spokesman.

Afghanistan has seen a sharp rise in bombings since the Taliban came to power. Earlier, a bomb blast rocked a high school in the Shiite-populated area of Dasht-e-Barchi, several kilometers from Kabul.

Reactions
 Pakistani Prime Minister Shahbaz Sharif in his statement said that he strongly condemned the bomb blast in the mosque in Mazar-e-Sharif and conveyed his heartfelt condolences and sympathy to the government and people of Afghanistan.
 The embassy of the Islamic Republic of Iran offered condolences to the families of the dead and prayed for speedy recovery of the injured. A statement issued by the Iranian embassy in Kabul said that "once again the blood of Muslim and fasting people of Afghanistan was shed during the holy month of Ramadan by the criminal and unclean hands of terrorists".
 UN special envoy Richard Bennett called the attacks on the Hazara community "systematic" and called for "immediate investigation, accountability and an end to such human rights abuses."
 Hezbollah and the Taliban have also condemned the terrorist attack in Afghanistan.

See also 
Terrorist incidents in Afghanistan in 2022
 April 2022 Kabul school bombing
 September 2022 Kabul school bombing
 2022 Kunduz mosque bombing
 28 April 2022 Mazar-i-Sharif bombings

References

Mass murder in 2022
2022 murders in Afghanistan
2020s building bombings
21st century in Balkh Province
Building bombings in Afghanistan
Crime in Balkh Province
21st-century mass murder in Afghanistan
ISIL terrorist incidents in Afghanistan
Islamic terrorist incidents in 2022
Mosque bombings by Islamists
Violence against Shia Muslims in Afghanistan
Improvised explosive device bombings in 2022
Mazar-i-Sharif
April 2022 events in Afghanistan
April 2022 crimes in Asia
Attacks on Shiite mosques
Mosque bombings in Asia
Terrorist incidents in Afghanistan in 2022
Attacks on religious buildings and structures in Afghanistan
Attacks on buildings and structures in 2022